Broomfield is a village and residential suburb in the City of Chelmsford district, immediately north of the city itself. It is the site of a major Accident & Emergency hospital. There are two public houses as well as primary and secondary schools  and sports clubs.

The village was struck by an F1/T2 tornado on 23 November 1981, as part of the record-breaking nationwide tornado outbreak on that day.

Local amenities
Broomfield Hospital is one of the largest in the East of England.  It is a national specialist centre for Plastics and Burns treatment. It also is a specialist clinic for the diagnosis and treatment of complex ENT cases.

There are two sports clubs - Broomfield F.C. and Broomfield Cricket Club. Broomfield Football Club was established in 1905. The club still plays on its ground in Mill Lane, Broomfield

The charity Green Zone Community Climate Action began in the village.

Schools
Broomfield Primary School is a primary school located on School Lane, next to the Scouts hut.

Chelmer Valley High School is a secondary school situated next to the hospital.

Transport
Several First Essex bus routes run between Broomfield and Chelmsford city centre.

Religious sites
The local church is St Mary with St Leonard, on Church Green. It has a round tower which is unusual for an Essex church. It is part of Chelmsford North Deanery.
There is also a Methodist church, at 124 Main Road.

Saxon princely tomb
Broomfield is the site of an important Anglo-Saxon burial which was discovered by workmen in 1888 after which there was a partial excavation. A more complete excavation was later made by CH Reid. Finds include weapons, gold ornaments and domestic items such as glassware, cups and buckets. The finds are now in the British Museum. The burial has been compared with Taplow and Sutton Hoo.

References

External links 
 Broomfield Parish Council
 Broomfield Conservation Area
 Broomfield Parish map

Villages in Essex
Civil parishes in Essex
Chelmsford